Rollen Edward Houser is a Thomistic philosopher and professor emeritus at the University of St. Thomas in Houston, Texas.

Biography 

Raised in Texas, Hauser earned a liberal arts degree from the University of Texas at Austin in 1968. He was a member of Phi Beta Kappa. After graduation, he served in the US military until 1970, including a deployment to Vietnam. In 1970, Hauser entered the Pontifical Institute of Mediaeval Studies at the University of Toronto, earning an M.A. in 1973, a licentiate in 1976, and a Ph.D. in 1981.

Houser taught at Niagara University from 1976 to 1987 before taking a post at the University of St. Thomas in Houston, Texas. He retired in 2018, and in 2019 he was awarded the Aquinas Medal from the American Catholic Philosophical Association. In view of the award, Archbishop J. Michael Miller said, "Dr. Ed Houser has made an outstanding contribution to scholarship on St Thomas."

Hauser is married to Mary Catherine Sommers, also a faculty member at the University of St. Thomas. They have four children.

Bibliography 
 The Cardinal Virtues: Aquinas, Albert, Philip the Chancellor (Pontifical Institute of Mediaeval Studies, 2004)
 Forged in the Storm (2018)
 Remnants of Tomorrow: The Anthology of Resuoh Book 2 (2019)
 Jade Horizons: The Anthology of Resuoh Book 3 (2019)
 The Eons of Elijah: The Anthology of Resuoh Book 4 (HouserBooks, 2019)
 Logic as a Liberal Art: An Introduction to Rhetoric and Reasoning (The Catholic University of America Press, 2020)

References 

Living people
University of Texas at Austin alumni
University of Toronto alumni
20th-century American philosophers
21st-century American philosophers
Writers from Texas
Year of birth missing (living people)
American military personnel of the Vietnam War